Nicholas Fortugno (born May 13, 1975) is an American game designer and educator. Fortugno is CCO of Playmatics LLC, a New York City-based game development studio focusing on casual games and co-founded with Margaret Wallace.

Fortugno is perhaps best known for designing Diner Dash, a top-selling casual game developed by Gamelab, and the award-winning Ayiti: The Cost of Life.  In addition to his large body of digital work, Fortugno has been involved in the design of numerous non-digital projects, including board games, collectible card games, large-scale social games, and live-action role-playing games (LARP).

Since 2002, Fortugno has taught the Game Design and Interactive Narrative program at Parsons School of Design, and has contributed to the development of the school's game design curriculum.  Fortugno also hosts and writes for the game journal and review site Critical Smack!.

Early life and education 

Born in the Bronx, New York, Fortugno was raised primarily in Yonkers, New York, where he attended Gorton High School. Fortugno earned Bachelor of Arts in English and Philosophy from the State University of New York at Purchase in 1997.  Between 2000 and 2002, he attended the City University of New York as a doctoral student in English Literature, and then Hunter College as a Master's student, with a concentration on post-war American novels.

Career

Gamelab 

Fortugno worked at Gamelab starting in 2000, ultimately becoming Director of Game Design before leaving in 2006.  Fortugno acted as lead designer and co-designer for many digital Gamelab projects, including:

Arcadia - Game Design, Process
Arcadia Remix – Designer
Ayiti: The Cost of Life - Lead Designer
Diner Dash - Lead Designer, Writer
Downbeat - Game Design
Drome Racing Challenge - Writer, Designer
Fate: The Carnivale Game - Level Designer, Writer
Inventor Saves the Day! - Lead Designer, Writer
Junkbot - Game Design
Junkbot Undercover - Game Design
LEGO Fever - Designer
Miss Management - Game Design
Motorbike Blast - Game Design
Plantasia - Lead Designer
Spybotics - Writer
Stack-It! - Lead Designer

Diner Dash

Diner Dash is an action strategy game in which the player takes the role of Flo, a stockbroker who quits her job to run her own diner.  One of the top-selling downloadable games of 2004, Diner Dash was later ported to mobile phone, given a retail release and made available via 100% advert-supported download. Versions have been created for the PSP, Game Boy Advance, and Nintendo DS platforms. GamingTalkHQ reported that a version for Xbox Live Arcade for the Xbox 360 was imminent. To date, Diner Dash has been downloaded over a half a billion times across all of its platforms.

Rebel Monkey 

Co-founded in 2007 by Fortugno and Margaret Wallace, Rebel Monkey is a New York City-based casual game development studio. Rebel Monkey received $1 million in first-round funding from Redpoint Ventures in February 2008.  In July 2008, Rebel Monkey released Habitat Rescue, a downloadable strategy game designed by Fortugno in which the player directs a group of lions in restoring their polluted savanna habitat. Habitat Rescue is currently distributed by National Geographic and RealArcade.  In early 2009, Rebel Monkey announced the launch of casual massively multiplayer online game CampFu.

CampFu

CampFu was an online virtual world with a summer camp theme.  Emphasizing collaborative team play and aimed at the teenaged demographic, CampFu officially launched on March 17, 2009 after a beta stage that began in February of the same year. CampFu was free to play, but users could access premium content by purchasing in-world currency called "FuCash" and/or a VIP membership subscription. Users could also earn Tickets, which could be exchanged for clothing items by playing CampFu games.  Games that were playable in CampFu included:

Veg-Out
WordMob
Fungeez
Critter Smackdown

CampFu was built on Rebel Monkey Inc.'s Monkey Wrench development platform.

Playmatics 

In September 2009, Fortugno and Wallace started a new company focused on game design and development called Playmatics, LLC.  In 2010, Playmatics created the Fortugno-designed interactive comic "The Interrogation" for the television series Breaking Bad. The game went on to be recognized for a CableFAX Best of the Web award. Other titles by Playmatics include Disney's The Kingdom Keepers "Race to Save the Magic."

Social and non-digital games 

In 2003, Fortugno teamed with Katie Salen and Frank Lantz to design the Big Urban Game (BUG) for the University of Minnesota's Design Celebration.  The BUG consisted of a race between three teams, each of which attempted to move a 25-foot high inflatable game piece past a series of checkpoints set through the Twin Cities.

Fortugno, Salen, and Lantz later collaborated again to make Slow Games, a two-page spread of games for Metropolis Magazine's 25th Anniversary issue in April 2006.

Later that year, Fortugno was one of five founders (including Greg Trefry, Catherine Herdlick, Mattia Romeo, and Seung-Taek "Peter" Lee) of Come Out & Play (CO&P), the world's first street game festival. The first CO&P ran in New York City from September 22 to 24.  With Trefry and Romeo, Fortugno designed the street game Insider; Fortugno also ran his original existential horror LARP entitled Ghost Engines in the Sky.  The following year, Amsterdam hosted the CO&P as part of the PICNIC Festival in 2007. CO&P returned to NYC June 6 to 8, 2008.

In Come Out & Play 2010 in NYC, Nick Fortugno partnered with Samuel Strick to create Humanoid Asteroids. Humanoid Asteroids has run in New York City, the following CO&P in San Francisco, and at IndieCade in Los Angeles. Humanoid Asteroids has also been covered by the game news blog Kotaku.

As part of Gamelab, Fortugno has designed several non-digital games for the Game Developers Conference, including: Alphabet City, Confquest, Leviathan, Pantheon, and Supercollider. He was also involved in the design process of the Mighty Beanz collectible card game and the X-Pod Face-Off board game.

Live-action role-playing games 

While attending SUNY Purchase in the mid-1990s, Fortugno began his Seasons of Darkness LARP, which ran for several years and was reported on in Rules of Play by Katie Salen and Eric Zimmerman and Daniel Mackay's The Fantasy Role-Playing Game.

In addition to Seasons of Darkness and CO&P's Ghost Engines in the Sky, Fortugno has created a multitude of additional LARPs, including A Measure for Marriage, a live-action role-playing game modeled after a Shakespearean comedy designed to facilitate a friend's marriage proposal.  Fortugno also created No Meaner Name Than Diplomacy, an upstairs/downstairs LARP performed at Gen Con.

Writing 

Fortugno has written a number of articles on game design and interactive narrative, including educational games, live-action roleplaying games, game usability, and interactive narrative in console games such as Shadow of the Colossus. Fortugno also hosts and writes for the games blog Critical Smack!, in which Fortugno plays and live-blogs his critical reactions to the games he plays in approximately hour-long sessions.

External links 
Playmatics, LLC
Critical Smack!
Rebel Monkey, Inc.
CampFu
Rebel Monkey raises $1M Investment
More details on Rebel Monkey project as it hires CTO
IMGDC: Nick Fortugno On The Rise Of The Casual MMO
New York Times article featuring Fortugno—Video Games Are Their Major, So Don't Call Them Slackers
A 2006 Gamasutra podcast featuring Fortugno—GDC Radio Presents - Gamasutra Podcast on Gamer Demographics, Part 2
Learning to Play to Learn, by Fortugno and Eric Zimmerman
Fortugno's reflections on A Measure for Marriage
Game Usability: Advancing the User Experience, a collection of essay on game usability containing "The Strange Case of the Casual Gamer", an essay by Fortugno about designing casual games.
Well-Played 1.0, an academic work on games containing "Losing Your Grip: Futility and Dramatic Necessity in Shadow of the Colossus", Fortugno's essay on interactive narrative in that game.

References 

Video game designers
Living people
1975 births